Nicholas Paul McKoy (born 3 September 1986) is an English former professional footballer who played as a midfielder. Following a match fixing scandal, McKoy was banned from the sport for life by FIFA in 2014.

Playing career
McKoy was born in Newham and began his career as a trainee with Wimbledon. He made his league debut on 13 December 2003 as a late substitute for Alex Tapp in a 1–0 defeat at home to Walsall. He remained with the Dons as they became Milton Keynes Dons until being released at the end of the 2005–06 season.

After being released by the Dons, he was signed by Championship side Cardiff City. He joined Torquay United on loan in January 2007 until the end of the 2006–07 season. He made his Torquay debut two days later in the 2–0 defeat at home to Southampton in the FA Cup. He was released by Cardiff in May 2007, having only made one appearance for them during a 2–0 loss to Barnet in the Football League Cup.

He went on trial at Shrewsbury Town in December 2007, playing for their reserve team. This was followed by a trial spell with St Johnstone during which he played in reserve matches against East Fife and Livingston. After trial spells with clubs including Barnet, Yeovil Town and Dagenham & Redbridge, McKoy signed a contract until the end of 2008 with St Johnstone on 21 August 2008. McKoy played in five league games for Saints before being released in December 2008. He signed for Enfield Town on New Year's Day 2009.

McKoy signed for Grays Athletic on 26 June 2009, along with Serge Makofo, Marcel McKie and Allan McLeod. He was released from Grays Athletic without making an appearance and joined Bishop's Stortford on trial in August. McKoy signed for Sutton United on 22 December, making his debut in the 3–0 home win against Carshalton Athletic on 28 December. He left in January 2010, citing personal reasons. He joined Kettering Town in October 2010. He went on to make 30 league appearances for the club, before joining Northampton Town in July 2011. He was sent off on 13 September 2011 against AFC Wimbledon, and this followed his sending off in his previous game. However, McKoy's contract was cancelled on 5 January 2012, by manager Aidy Boothroyd who stated he "was not going to be a part of the future". Although, Boothroyd did state that McKoy did have "a move lined up".

He signed for Tamworth a day later to link up with manager Marcus Law again, having worked under at Kettering Town. McKoy made his debut against Everton at Goodison Park in a Third Round FA Cup tie, which Tamworth lost 2–0. McKoy resigned for Sutton United at the start of the 2012–13 season, and played nine times without being on the winning side. He was released on 2 October 2012.

McKoy briefly signed with Australian Victorian Premier League club Southern Stars in 2013 where he made several appearances, however due to his involvement in a match fixing scandal during that season, his appearances for the club were removed from official record. McKoy was later banned from the sport for life by FIFA.

Match fixing
McKoy was arrested on 15 September 2013 on suspicion of match fixing while playing with the Southern Stars in the Victorian Premier League in Australia. He pleaded guilty to three counts of "offering to engage in conduct to corrupt a betting outcome" at Melbourne Magistrates Court, and was subsequently banned from football by FIFA for life and fined $1,500 by the courts. In 2016, he approached the FFA about having his ban overturned.

Career statistics

References

External links

1986 births
Living people
English footballers
Association football midfielders
Wimbledon F.C. players
Milton Keynes Dons F.C. players
Cardiff City F.C. players
Torquay United F.C. players
Potters Bar Town F.C. players
St Johnstone F.C. players
Enfield Town F.C. players
Grays Athletic F.C. players
Sutton United F.C. players
Kettering Town F.C. players
Northampton Town F.C. players
Tamworth F.C. players
Hornchurch F.C. players
English Football League players
Scottish Football League players
National League (English football) players
Isthmian League players
Footballers from the London Borough of Newham